Rubus hispidoides is a rare North American species of flowering plant in the rose family. It has been found only in the Commonwealth (state) of Massachusetts in the northeastern United States.

The genetics of Rubus is extremely complex, so that it is difficult to decide on which groups should be recognized as species. There are many rare species with limited ranges such as this. Further study is suggested to clarify the taxonomy.

References

External links
photo of herbarium specimen at Missouri Botanical Garden

hispidoides
Plants described in 1947
Flora of Massachusetts
Flora without expected TNC conservation status